Baspa River rises near the Indo-Chinese border and forms the Baspa Valley (also known as the Sangla Valley) - one of the most scenic in Himalayas. The Chung Sakhago Pass lies at the head of the valley. It is fed by the perennial glaciers and shares the catchment area with the Ganges.

Baspa starts at the Baspa hills, joins Sutlej River from the left bank near Karcham. The upper and middle slopes of the valley along the river are covered with pine and oak forests. Pastures, meadows and fields cover the lower slopes. Some of the most picturesque villages in the Himalayas can be found here. Only the lower half of the 95 kilometers length of the valley is inhabited - all the way from Chitkul (3,475 m) to where the Baspa meets the Sutlej River at Karcham (1,830 m).

Though gentle most of the way, it would be difficult to raft in Baspa as some stretches have sheer falls.

References

Rivers of Himachal Pradesh
Geography of Kinnaur district
Indus basin
Rivers of India